Owen Davidson and Billie Jean King were the defending champions, but Davidson did not compete. King partnered with Clark Graebner but lost in the semifinals to Ilie Năstase and Rosie Casals.

Năstase and Casals defeated Kim Warwick and Evonne Goolagong in the final, 6–4, 6–4 to win the mixed doubles tennis title at the 1972 Wimbledon Championships.

Seeds

  Kim Warwick /  Evonne Goolagong (final)
  Ilie Năstase /  Rosie Casals (champions)
  Clark Graebner /  Billie Jean King (semifinals)
  Frew McMillan /  Judy Dalton (quarterfinals)

Draw

Finals

Top half

Section 1

Section 2

Section 3

Section 4

Bottom half

Section 5

Section 6

Section 7

Section 8

References

External links

1972 Wimbledon Championships – Doubles draws and results at the International Tennis Federation

 

X=Mixed Doubles
Wimbledon Championship by year – Mixed doubles